Yıldızköy can refer to the following villages in Turkey:

 Yıldızköy, Adilcevaz
 Yıldızköy, Amasya
 Yıldızköy, Mut